An A-Z list of films produced in Cyprus:

A
1 Day with George in Cyprus (2016)
Afti i nihta meni (1999) 
Agapanthemon (1982) 
Agapes kai kaimoi (1971) 
Akamas (2006) 
Anastenazoun oi penies (1970) 
Anazitontas tin eftihia (1972) 
Attilas '74 (1974)
 (2000)
 (1981)

B 
Bar (2001)

C
Çamur (2003) 
Castro's Cuba (1989) (TV) 
Cherry Orchard, The (1999)
Cypriot National Final (2005) (TV)

D 
Dakrya kai diplopennies (1969) 
Diakopes stin Kypro mas (1971) 
Don't make a sound (2009)
Dromoi kai portokalia (1996) 
 (1991)
Deserted (Απομόνωση)

E
Ego... kai to pouli mou (1982)
 (2000) 
Ena koritsi pou ta thelei ola (1972) 
Espresso (2000)

F
Forgetting Aphrodite (2004) 
Fish n' Chips (2011)
Ftero tis mygas, To (1995)
Funeral 1998
Font of Infamy (2020)

G

H
Halam Geldi (2013)
Honey and Wine (2006) 
House of the Insect (2002)

I
 (1974)
If Aphrodite had arms (2007)

K
Kai to treno pai ston ourano (2002)
Kalabush (2002) 
Kato apo ta asteria (2001) 
Kavafis (1996) 
Knifer (2010)
Kokkinos drakos (1998)
Kyklos tis amartias
Kyrios me ta gri, O (1997)
Kayip Otobus (2007)
Kypron, ou m' ethespisen...(Helen) (1962)

L
Leptomereia stin Kypro (1987) 
Lesvia, I (1975)

M
Malgaat (2005) 
Mavri Emmanouella, I (1979) 
Mavrosoufitsa (2002)
Me ton Orfea ton Avgousto (1995)

N
Nisi tis Afroditis, To (1965) 
–

O
Oikopedo Dodeka (2013)
One Day with George in Cyprus (2016)
One in a Million (2005)

P
Pause (2018)
Pyla, living together separately (2003)
Pharmakon (2006) 
Private Movies: Lady of the Rings (2005) 
Private Movies: Lady of the Rings 2 (2005)
Pouli Tis Kyprou, To  (2014)

R
Resurrection (2006) 
Road to Ithaca, The (1999)

S
Sfagi tou kokora, I (1996)
Social Dinner (2003)
Sunrise in Kimmeria (2018)
Smuggling Hendrix (2019)

T
Tama, To (2000) 
Teleftaio fili, To (1970)

V
Vasiliki (1997)
Viasmos tis Afroditis, O (1985)
Visions of Europe (2004)

W
The Wastrel (1961)

See also
 List of Turkish films
 List of Greek films
 Cinema of Cyprus
 Cinema of Turkey
 Cinema of Greece

External links
 Cypriot film at the Internet Movie Database

Cyprus
Films